The MG One (stylised as ONE) is a compact crossover SUV manufactured by Chinese manufacturer SAIC Motor under the MG marque.

Overview
The MG One was released on 30 July 2021. Its styling adopts the "third-generation family design" of MG, and it is the first vehicle built above the SIGMA architecture. Two versions are available with the α version as the sportier variant and the β version as the high tech variant, the variants are differentiated with slight styling differences.

Powertrain

References

External links 

One
Cars introduced in 2021
Compact sport utility vehicles
Crossover sport utility vehicles
Front-wheel-drive vehicles
Cars of China